Faxon is a census-designated place (CDP) in Loyalsock Township, Lycoming County, Pennsylvania, United States. As of the 2010 census, it had a population of 1,395. Faxon is not a separately incorporated community, but is a part of Loyalsock Township (which is a municipality under Pennsylvania law).

Faxon is bordered by the city of Williamsport to the west, Four Mile Drive to the north, Miller Run and the CDP of Kenmar to the east, and Interstate 180 to the south.

There was a CDP named Faxon in Lycoming County before, but it lost that status in the 1990 Census.

Demographics

References

Census-designated places in Lycoming County, Pennsylvania
Census-designated places in Pennsylvania